Golden Rule Insurance Company was a provider of health insurance based in Indianapolis with operations in 40 U.S. states and the District of Columbia. It was acquired by UnitedHealth Group in November 2003.

It was closely involved in the establishment of health savings accounts (HSA) and the related tax incentives. The company funded millions of dollars to prominent members of the Republican Party such as Newt Gingrich to support HSAs and to fight broader reform.

Membership in Federation of American Consumers and Travelers (FACT) was required to buy certain insurance products.

The company was named after the Golden Rule.

History
The company was founded in 1940.

In 1976, J. Patrick Rooney became CEO. In the 1980s, he moved the company from Lawrenceville, Illinois to Indianapolis. He retired from the company in 1996.

In 1981, the company sued the Educational Testing Service (ETS) and the Illinois Department of Insurance, claiming that the ETS examination for Illinois insurance agents discriminated against members of minority groups. The parties reached a settlement.

In August 1991, the company announced that it would pay half of the tuition for 500 low-income children in Indianapolis.

The company was acquired by UnitedHealth Group in 2003.  

The current CEO is Patrick F. Carr who started in 2012.

References

Financial services companies established in 1940
Financial services companies disestablished in 2003
1940 establishments in Illinois
2003 mergers and acquisitions
Defunct health care companies of the United States